American Samoa competed at the 2000 Summer Olympics in Sydney, Australia.

Archery

Athletics

Men
Track events

Women
Field events

Weightlifting

Officials
President: Mr. Ben Solaita
Secretary General: Mr. Ken Tupua
Chef de Mission: Mr. Eddie Imo
Attache: Mrs. Simeafou Imo 
Chief Medical Officer: Mr. Chris Spalding, ATC
Archery Coach: Mr. Dave Tupua
Weightlifting Coach: Mr. Roy Brown

References

Wallechinsky, David (2004). The Complete Book of the Summer Olympics (Athens 2004 Edition). Toronto, Canada. . 
International Olympic Committee (2001). The Results. Retrieved 12 November 2005.
Sydney Organising Committee for the Olympic Games (2001). The Results. Retrieved 20 November 2005.
International Olympic Committee Web Site

Nations at the 2000 Summer Olympics
2000
2000 in American Samoan sports